Pachystroma is a monotypic plant genus in the family Euphorbiaceae first described as a genus in 1865. It is the only genus of its tribe (Pachystromateae). The only known species is Pachystroma longifolium, native to Brazil, Bolivia and Peru.

References

Euphorbioideae
Monotypic Euphorbiaceae genera
Flora of South America
Trees of Peru